Fibonacci (also , ;  – ), also known as Leonardo Bonacci, Leonardo of Pisa, or Leonardo Bigollo Pisano ('Leonardo the Traveller from Pisa'), was an Italian mathematician from the Republic of Pisa, considered to be "the most talented Western mathematician of the Middle Ages".

However, even earlier, in 1506, a notary of the Holy Roman Empire, Perizolo mentions Leonardo as "Lionardo Fibonacci".
 
Fibonacci popularized the Indo–Arabic numeral system in the Western world primarily through his composition in 1202 of Liber Abaci (Book of Calculation).  He also introduced Europe to the sequence of Fibonacci numbers, which he used as an example in Liber Abaci.

Biography
Fibonacci was born around 1170 to Guglielmo, an Italian merchant and customs official. Guglielmo directed a trading post in Bugia (Béjaïa) in modern-day Algeria), the capital of the Hammadid empire. Fibonacci travelled with him as a young boy, and it was in Bugia (Algeria) where he was educated that he learned about the Hindu–Arabic numeral system.

Fibonacci travelled around the Mediterranean coast, meeting with many merchants and learning about their systems of doing arithmetic. He soon realised the many advantages of the Hindu-Arabic system, which, unlike the Roman numerals used at the time, allowed easy calculation using a place-value system. In 1202, he completed the Liber Abaci (Book of Abacus or The Book of Calculation), which popularized Hindu–Arabic numerals in Europe.

Fibonacci was a guest of Emperor Frederick II, who enjoyed mathematics and science. A member of Frederick II's court, John of Palermo, posed several questions based on Arab mathematical works for Fibonacci to solve. In 1240, the Republic of Pisa honored Fibonacci (referred to as Leonardo Bigollo) by granting him a salary in a decree that recognized him for the services that he had given to the city as an advisor on matters of accounting and instruction to citizens.

Fibonacci is thought to have died between 1240 and 1250, in Pisa.

Liber Abaci

In the Liber Abaci (1202), Fibonacci introduced the so-called modus Indorum (method of the Indians), today known as the Hindu–Arabic numeral system, with ten digits including a zero and positional notation. The book showed the practical use and value of this by applying the numerals to commercial bookkeeping, converting weights and measures, calculation of interest, money-changing, and other applications. The book was well-received throughout educated Europe and had a profound impact on European thought. Replacing Roman numerals, its ancient Egyptian multiplication method, and using an abacus for calculations, was an advance in making business calculations easier and faster, which assisted the growth of banking and accounting in Europe.

The original 1202 manuscript is not known to exist. In a 1228 copy of the manuscript, the first section introduces the numeral system and compares it with others, such as Roman numerals, and methods to convert numbers to it. The second section explains uses in business, for example converting different currencies, and calculating profit and interest, which were important to the growing banking industry. The book also discusses irrational numbers and prime numbers.

Fibonacci sequence

Liber Abaci posed and solved a problem involving the growth of a population of rabbits based on idealized assumptions. The solution, generation by generation, was a sequence of numbers later known as Fibonacci numbers. Although Fibonacci's Liber Abaci contains the earliest known description of the sequence outside of India, the sequence had been described by Indian mathematicians as early as the sixth century.

In the Fibonacci sequence, each number is the sum of the previous two numbers. Fibonacci omitted the "0" and first "1" included today and began the sequence with 1, 2, 3, ... . He carried the calculation up to the thirteenth place, the value 233, though another manuscript carries it to the next place, the value 377. Fibonacci did not speak about the golden ratio as the limit of the ratio of consecutive numbers in this sequence.

Legacy
In the 19th century, a statue of Fibonacci was set in Pisa. Today it is located in the western gallery of the Camposanto, historical cemetery on the Piazza dei Miracoli.

There are many mathematical concepts named after Fibonacci  because of a connection to the Fibonacci numbers. Examples include the Brahmagupta–Fibonacci identity, the Fibonacci search technique, and the Pisano period. Beyond mathematics, namesakes of Fibonacci include the asteroid 6765 Fibonacci and the art rock band The Fibonaccis.

Works
 Liber Abaci (1202), a book on calculations (English translation by Laurence Sigler, 2002)
 Practica Geometriae (1220), a compendium of techniques in surveying, the measurement and partition of areas and volumes, and other topics in practical geometry (English translation by Barnabas Hughes, Springer, 2008).
 Flos (1225), solutions to problems posed by Johannes of Palermo
 Liber quadratorum ("The Book of Squares") on Diophantine equations, dedicated to Emperor Frederick II. See in particular congruum and the Brahmagupta–Fibonacci identity.
 Di minor guisa (on commercial arithmetic; lost)
 Commentary on Book X of Euclid's Elements (lost)

See also
 Fibonacci numbers in popular culture
 Republic of Pisa
 Adelard of Bath

Notes

References

Further reading

 Goetzmann, William N. and Rouwenhorst, K.Geert (2005). The Origins of Value: The Financial Innovations That Created Modern Capital Markets.  Oxford University Press Inc., US, .
 Goetzmann, William N., Fibonacci and the Financial Revolution (October 23, 2003), Yale School of Management International Center for Finance Working Paper No. 03–28
 Grimm, R. E., "The Autobiography of Leonardo Pisano", Fibonacci Quarterly, Vol. 11, No. 1, February 1973, pp. 99–104.
 Horadam, A. F. "Eight hundred years young," The Australian Mathematics Teacher 31 (1975) 123–134.
 Gavin, J., Schärlig, A., extracts of Liber Abaci online and analyzed on BibNum [click 'à télécharger' for English analysis]

External links

 "Fibonacci, Leonardo, or Leonardo of Pisa." Complete Dictionary of Scientific Biography. 2008. Encyclopedia.com. (April 20, 2015). 
Fibonacci at Convergence

Fibonacci (2 vol., 1857 & 1862) Il liber abaci and Practica Geometriae – digital facsimile from the Linda Hall Library
Fibonacci, Liber abbaci Bibliotheca Augustana

1250 deaths
1170s births
13th-century Latin writers
13th-century Italian mathematicians
Fibonacci numbers
Italian Roman Catholics
Medieval European mathematics
Number theorists
People from Pisa
Medieval geometers
Italian expatriates in Algeria
Court of Frederick II, Holy Roman Emperor